Craig Street, born in Oakland, California, is a noted record producer.

Street moved with his family to Los Angeles at the age of 11, but returned to the Bay Area for his high school years.  He began playing guitar at age 14, and was in a number of Berkeley bands.  In 1981 he interviewed Alan Douglas for an NPR documentary about Jimi Hendrix, which Street co-produced with then KPFA-FM 3rd World Director Bari Scott, and San Jose radio broadcaster Don West. He moved to New York in the 1980s, where he began producing records, starting with Blue Light 'til Dawn by jazz vocalist Cassandra Wilson. Wilson had just signed with the Blue Note label. The album was Wilson's commercial breakthrough and Street went on to produce often successful records of mainly female singers.

Street has produced albums in a variety of genres, including pop, jazz, soul, and country. In a 1998 interview, he told the Los Angeles Times, "I know it sounds corny, but I never learned how to separate music, to make distinctions between genres." His music production credits include Norah Jones, k.d. lang, Rebekka Bakken, Charlie Sexton, Meshell Ndegeocello, Joe Henry, John Legend, The Manhattan Transfer, Bettye LaVette, Chris Whitley, Geri Allen, Holly Cole, and others.

Come Away with Me, which he co-produced for Norah Jones, won a Grammy for album of the year in 2002.

Discography

External links
Craig Street on Allmusic.com
Interview with Craig Street on Mixonline.com

References

Record producers from California
Living people
Businesspeople from Oakland, California
Grammy Award winners
Year of birth missing (living people)